During the 1991–92 English football season, Bristol City F.C. competed in the Football League Second Division.

Season summary
In the 1991–92 season, Bristol City made a bright start to the campaign and by 9 November after 17 games, the Robins sat 1 point of the play-off places and looked as though they would challenge for a play-off spot but afterwards, a poor run of form which saw Bristol City win only 1 from their next 18 league matches and as a result slipped to the relegation zone with only Port Vale below them and it seemed the Robins were favourites to go down following a huge collapse of form but an 8-game unbeaten run which include 5 wins, kept them up and the Robins finished in 17th place.

Final league table

Results
Bristol City's score comes first

Legend

Football League Second Division

FA Cup

League Cup

Full Members Cup

Squad

References

Bristol City F.C. seasons
Bristol City